The Prix Saintour is a series of prizes awarded annually by each of the five institutions making up the Institut de France since 1835.

The Académie des inscriptions et belles-lettres and the Academie des sciences morales et politiques still award the prix Saintour.

Laureates of the Académie Française

From 1893 to 1924
 1893 :
 Gaston de Raimes (1859-19..) for Soldats de France, actions héroïques
 André Saglio for Maisons d’hommes célèbres
 1894 :
 Charles-Louis Livet (1828-1898) for Lexique comparé de la langue de Molière et des autres écrivains
 1895 :
 Edmond Huguet for Étude sur la syntaxe de Rabelais
 Maxime Lanusse (1853-1930) for De l’influence du dialecte gascon sur la langue française, de la fin du XVe siècle à la seconde moitié du XVIIe siècle
 Abbé Charles Urbain (1852-1930) for Nicolas Coeffeteau (1574-1623)
 1896 :
 Napoléon-Maurice Bernardin for Un précurseur de Racine, Tristan l’Hermite, sieur Du Solier (1601-1655)
 Abel Lefranc for Les dernières poésies de Marguerite de Navarre
 1897 :
 Arsène Darmesteter for Cours historiques de la langue française
 Gustave Michaut for Pensées de Pascal
 1898 :
 Léon Brunschvicg for Blaise Pascal
 Abbé Joseph Lebarq (1844-1897) for Œuvres oratoires de Bossuet
 Maurice Souriau (1856-195.?) for La préface de Cromwell, de Victor Hugo
 1899 :
 Louis Arnould for Racan (1589-1670)
 Armand Gasté for La querelle du Cid
 1900 :
 Ferdinand Brunot for Histoire de la langue française, des origines à nos jours
 Louis Clément (1858-19..) for Henri Estienne et son œuvre française
 1901 :
 Joseph Bédier for Le roman de Tristan et Iseut
 Henri Chamard for Joachim du Bellay (1522-1560)
 Arthur and Paul Desfeuilles (1822-1907 et 1866-1943) for Lexique de la langue de Molière
 1902 :
 Auguste Hamon (1860-1935) for Jean Bouchet (1476-1557)
 Charles Marty-Laveaux for all of his works on the 16th century
 1903 :
 Guillaume Hüszar (1872-1931) for Corneille et le théâtre espagnol
 Elvire Samfiresco for Ménage : polémiste, philologue, poète
 Léon Séché for Œuvres complètes de Joachim du Bellay
 1904 :
 Antoine Albalat for Le travail du style enseigné par les corrections manuscrites des grands écrivains
 Henri Chardon (1834-1906) for Scarron inconnu. Les personnages du roman comique
 Remy de Gourmont for La culture des idées, Le problème du style and Esthétique de la langue française
 Georges Doncieux (1856-1903) for Le romancero populaire de la France
 1905 :
 Henri Chamard for Joachim du Bellay. La Défense et illustration de la langue française
 Ferdinand Gohin (1867-1944) for Les transformations de la langue française au XVIIIe siècle (1740-1789)
 Paul Laumonier (1867-1949) for Œuvres poétiques de Jacques Péletier du Mans
 Jacques Trénel (1858-....) for L’Ancien Testament et la langue française du moyen-âge. L’élément biblique dans l’œuvre d’Agrippa d’Aubigné
 1906 :
 Joseph Anglade for Le troubadour Guiraut Riquier, étude de la décadence de l’ancienne poésie provençale
 Félix Piquet for L’originalité de Gottfried de Strasbourg dans son poème de Tristan et Isolde
 1907 :
 Louis Lautrey for Journal de voyage de Montaigne
 Louis Mellerio (1859-19..) for Lexique de Ronsard
 Fortunat Strowski for Édition des Essais de Michel de Montaigne
 1908 :
 Edmond Girard (1860-1928) for les Œuvres de Tristan l’Hermite
 Edmond Huguet for Petit glossaire des classiques français du XVIIe siècle
 Abbé J.-A. Quillacq for La langue et la syntaxe de Bossuet
 Robert Lindsay Graeme Ritchie (1880-1954) for Recherches sur la syntaxe de la conjonction "que" dans l’ancien français
 1909 :
 René Onillon (1854-19..) and Anatole-Joseph Verrier (1841-1920) for Glossaire étymologique et historique des patois et des parlers de l’Anjou
 Théodore Rosset for Entretien, doutes, critique et remarques du Père Bouhours sur la langue française (1671-1692)
 1910 :
 Bulletin du parler français au Canada
 Vladimir Chichmarev (1874-1957) for Guillaume de Machaut. Poésies lyriques
 Frédéric Lachèvre for Le libertinage devant le Parlement de Paris. Le procès du poète Théophile de Viau (11 juillet 1623-1er septembre 1625)
 Hugues Vaganay (1870-1936) for Les amours de P. de Ronsard Vandomois, commentées par Marc-Antoine de Muret
 1911 :
 Gustave Boissière (1850-1927) for Remarques sur les poésies de Malherbe, de Urbain Chevreau
 Ferdinand Gohin (1867-1944) for Œuvres poétiques, de Antoine Héroët
 Abbé Eugène Griselle (1861-1923) for Éditions de Bossuet et Fénelon. Leur correspondance. Richelieu et Louis XIII. Lettres inédites
 Henri-Joseph Molinier for Essai biographique et littéraire sur Octavien de Saint-Gelays, évêque d’Angoulême (1468-1502) et Mellin de Saint-Gelays (1490-1558)
 1912 :
 Paul Berret (1861-1943) for Le moyen-âge dans la légende des siècles et les sources de Victor Hugo
 Albert Chérel (1880-1962) for Explications des maximes des Saints sur la vie intérieure, de Fénelon
 Philippe Martinon for  Les Strophes
 Charles Oulmont for Pierre Gringore
 Théodore Rosset for Les origines de la prononciation moderne étudiées au XVIIe siècle
 Louis Thuasne for Villon et Rabelais
 1913 :
 Octave Carion for Méthode nouvelle pour l’étude des homonymes de la langue française
 Léon Clédat for Dictionnaire étymologique de la langue française
 Paul Laumonier (1867-1949) for La vie de Pierre de Ronsard, de Claude Binet (1586)
 Lazare Sainéan for Les sources de l’argot ancien
 1914 :
 Antoine Albalat for Comment il faut lire les auteurs classiques français
 François Gébelin for Correspondance de Montesquieu
 Maurice Grammont for Le vers français, ses moyens d’expression, son harmonie
 G. O. d'Harvé for Parlons bien !
 André Morize (1883-1957) for Correspondance de Montesquieu
 Hans Sternischa for Deux grammairiens de la fin du XVIIIe siècle (L. Aug. Alemand et Andry de Bois-Regard)
 1915 :
 Maxime David (1885-1914)
 Georges Feuilloy (1883-1915)
 René Sturel (1885-1914)
 Léon Vouaux (1870-1914)
 1917 :
 Kristoffer Nyrop for Grammaire historique de la langue française
 1918 :
 Émile Magne for Lettres inédites de Mme Louise de Gonzague sur la cour de Louis XIV
 Adolphe van Bever for Les poètes du terroir du XVe au XXe siècle
 Divna Veković (1886-1944) for Dictionnaire français-serbe et serbe-français
 1919 :
 Lucien Foulet (1873-1958) for Le roman de Renard
 1920 :
 Paul Laumonier (1867-1949) for Édition des Œuvres de Ronsard
 1921 :
 Henri Bauche (1880-1947) for Le langage populaire
 Paul Berret (1861-1943) for Victor Hugo. La légende des siècles
 Édouard Bonnaffé for Dictionnaire étymologique et historique des anglicismes
 Pierre Villey for Les Essais de Michel Montaigne. Les Sources des Essais
 1922 :
 Pierre Adam for La langue du duc de Saint-Simon
 Joseph Anglade for Histoire sommaire de la littérature méridionale au moyen âge (des origines à la fin du XVe siècle)
 Frédéric Lachèvre for Les œuvres libertines de Cyrano de Bergerac
 1923 :
 Sœurs de la Visitation for Œuvres de Saint-François de Sales
 Joseph Vianey for Victor Hugo : Les Contemplations
 1924 :
 Gustave Rudler (1872-1957) for Les techniques de la critique et de l’histoire littéraires en littérature française moderne
 Louis Thuasne for François Villon. Œuvres

From 1925 to 1957
 1925 :
 Ferdinand Gohin (1867-1944) for Le compte du rossignol, de A. Gilles Corrozet. Cléopâtre, captive, de Étienne Jodelle
 Adrien Langlois for Le Style. La Chose et la Matière du XVIIe au XXe siècle
 Société des textes français modernes
 Hugues Vaganay (1870-1936) for Publication des Œuvres complètes de Ronsard, textes de 1578
 1926 :
 Abbé Joseph Coppin (1885-1978) for Montaigne, traducteur de Raymond Sebon
 Paul Festugière (1869-1950) for les Œuvres de J.-Fr. Sarasin
 Pierre Martino for Stendhal-Racine et Shakespeare
 Daniel Mornet for Édition de la Nouvelle Héloïse, de Jean-Jacques Rousseau
 1927 :
 Joseph Calmette for Philippe de Commynes. Mémoires
 Georges Durville (1853-1943) for Commynes. Mémoires
 Gabriel Germinet (1882-1969) for Théâtre radiophonique
 C.-S. Lefèvre for La composition littéraire
 1928 :
 Charles Beaulieux for Histoire de l’orthographe française (2 vol.)
 1929 :
 J.-Wladimir Bienstock and Curnonsky for Le musée des erreurs ou le Français tel qu'on l'écrit
 Roger Crétin alias Roger Vercel for Lexique comparé des métaphores dans le théâtre de Corneille et Racine
 Gaston Guillaumie (1883-1960) for J.-L. Guez de Balzac et la prose française
 Mgr René Moissenet (1850-1939) for La prononciation du latin
 1930 :
 Edmond Faral for La légende arthurienne
 1931 :
 Louis Arnould for Poésies de Racan
 André Boulanger for L’art poétique de Jacques Peletier du Mans
 Abbé Joseph Coppin (1885-1978) for Les vers de la mort, d’Hélimant moine de Froidmond
 Albert Dauzat for Histoire de la langue française
 A. Le Dû for Le rythme dans la prose de Victor Hugo
 1932 :
 Louis-Alexandre Bergounioux for Les œuvres poétiques d'Hugues Salel
 Chanoine Henri Cuvillier for La langue française expliquée
 Maurice Parturier (1888-1980) for l'Édition des Lettres de Mérimée
 1933 :
 Oscar Bloch for Dictionnaire étymologique de la langue française
 1934 :
 Armand Garnier for Les tragiques de d'Aubigné
 Ferdinand Gohin (1867-1944) for Jean de La Fontaine
 Jean Plattard for les tragiques de d'Aubigné
 1935 :
 Georges Mongrédien for Historiettes de Tallemant des Réaux
 1936 :
 René Johannet for Édition de Joseph de Maistre
 Henri Martineau for Édition de Stendhal
 Jeanne Streicher (18..?-1963) for l'Édition des Remarques sur la langue française, de Vaugelas
 1938 :
 Louis Arnould for Édition des Bergeries, de Racan
 Paul Van Tieghem (1871-1948) for Répertoire des littératures modernes
 1939 :
 Gustave Cohen for Œuvres complètes de Ronsard
 Ferdinand Gohin (1867-1944) for Jean de La Fontaine
 Jacques Pannier
for Les œuvres de Calvin
 1940 :
 Marcel Cressot (1896-1961) for La Phrase et le Vocabulaire dans Huysmans
 Albert-Marie Schmidt for La Poésie scientifique en France
 1941 :
 Raoul Mortier (1881-1951) for La Chanson de Roland, version d'Oxford
 1942 :
 Gaston Guillaumie (1883-1960) for Jasmin, Le Théâtre gascon and Florilège des poètes gascons
 Émile Martin for Un patois lorrain
 Henri Martineau for Souvenirs d'égotisme
 Raoul Mortier (1881-1951) for La Chanson de Roland, version de Venise IV
 Henry Potez for Lettres galantes de Denys Lambin
 François Préchac (1881-1977) for Lettres galantes de Denys Lambin
 1943 :
 Hélène Derréal (1903-1989) for La langue de Saint Pierre Fourier and Le style de Saint Pierre Fourier
 Raoul Mortier (1881-1951) for Édition de la Chanson de Roland (Tome IV, texte de Paris)
 1944 :
 Armand Caraccio (1895-1969) for Promenades dans Rome, de Stendhal
 Michel François for L'heptaméron de Marguerite de Navarre
 Jules Mouquet (1878-1949) for Samain, poèmes à la grande amie
 Maximilien Vox for Correspondance de Napoléon
 1946 :
 Arnold van Gennep for Manuel du folklore français
 1947 :
 René Bailly (1910-1987) for Dictionnaire des Synonymes
 1948 :
 Marcel Cressot (1896-1961) for Le style et ses techniques
 Léon Delhoume (1887-1965) for Principes de médecine expérimentale, de Claude Bernard
 Jean Marchand for Le livre de raison, de Montaigne
 1949 :
 Robert Baschet for Publication du Journal de Delécluse
 Yves Le Hir (1919-2005) for Lamennais écrivain
 1950 :
 Antoine Bibesco for Lettres de Proust à Bibesco
 Paul Robert for Dictionnaire. Les mots et les associations d'idées
 1951 :
 Patrice Buet (1889-1953) for Poèmes français de poètes étrangers
 Joseph Canteloube for Anthologie des chants populaires français
 André Delattre for Voltaire. Correspondance avec les Tronchin
 1952 :
 Georges Roth (1887-1975) for Histoire de Mme de Montbrillant, version intégrale des pseudo-mémoires de Mme d’Épinay
 1953 :
 Dr Fernand Lotte for Dictionnaire biographique des personnages fictifs de la Comédie humaine
 Nada Tomiche (1923-2019) for Napoléon écrivain
 1954 :
 André Desguine (1902-1981) for Étude des Bacchanales par Ronsard
 Charles Guérin for Les Odes de Pierre de Ronsard
 1955 :
 Jean Babin (1905-1978) for Les parlers de l’Argonne
 Armand Ziwès for Le jargon de M. François Villon
 1956 :
 Marcel Galliot (1899-1989) for Essai sur la Langue de la Réclame
 Louis de Saint-Pierre for Les Mémoires du maréchal Soult
 1957 :
 Adolphe Victor Thomas for Dictionnaire des difficultés de la langue française

From 1958 to 1989
 1958 :
 Yolande Arsène-Henry for Les plus beaux textes sur le Saint-Esprit
 1959 :
 René-Jean Hesbert for Les Conférences ascétiques et Perfection du chef, de Dom Martin et Science et Sainteté, de Dom Jean Mabillon
 Élisabeth Poulain and Gaston Poulain (1903-1973) for the regional Anthologies of Haut-Languedoc et Armagnac and of Bas-Languedoc et Roussillon
 Jeanne Streicher (18..?-1963) for Les œuvres poétiques, de Théophile de Viau
 1960 :
 Jean Labbé for Correspondance de Francis Jammes
 1961 :
 Joseph Barbier (1915-1986) for Le vocabulaire et le style de Péguy
 Louis Châtelain and Georges Galichet (1904-1992) for Grammaire française expliquée
 1962 :
 Helmut Hatzfeld et Yves Le Hir (1919-2005) for Essai de bibliographie critique de stylistique française et romane
 Henri Morier for Dictionnaire de poétique et de rhétorique
 1963 :
 Jacqueline Pinchon (1921-2020) and Robert-Léon Wagner for Grammaire du Français classique et moderne
 1964 :
 Pierre Jourda for Édition des Œuvres de Rabelais
 1965 :
 Albert-Jean Guibert for Bibliographie des œuvres de Molière publiées au XVIIe siècle
 Madeleine Horn-Monval for Répertoire bibliographique des Traductions et Adaptations françaises du Théâtre étranger
 Georges Palassie (Société des Amis de Montaigne) for Mémorial du 1e Congrès International des Études montaignistes
 1966 :
 Émile-Jules-François Arnould for La genèse du Barbier de Séville
 1967 :
 Albert Doppagne for Trois aspects du français contemporain
 Henri Perrochon for De Rousseau à Ramuz
 Samuel Silvestre de Sacy for Édition des Œuvres de Descartes
 1968 :
 André Porquet for L’orthographe française
 1969 :
 Maurice Delamain for Plaidoyer pour les mots
 Maurice Joseph-Gabriel for La Dissertation pédagogique
 1970 :
 Nina Catach for L’orthographe française à l’époque de la Renaissance
 Fernand Criqui (1921-2006) for Mots et Concepts - Lexique permanent
 1971 :
 Robert Beauvais for L’Hexagonal tel qu’on le parle
 Fernand Duplouy and René Galichet for Méthode active d’initiation à la composition française
 Robert Le Bidois for Les mots trompeurs
 1973 :
 Roger Guichemerre (1924-2018) for La comédie avant Molière
 Mme Claude Labarraque Reyssac for En marge de Molière. La jeunesse de Philaminte
 Georges Martin for Nîmes dans la littérature
 Guy Turbet-Delof (1922-2008) for L’Afrique barbaresque dans la littérature aux XVIe et XVIIe siècles
 1975 :
 Hélène Bourgeois-Gielen, Albert Doppagne and Joseph Hanse for Nouvelle chasse aux Belgicismes
 1976 :
 Henri Bénac and Jean-Yves Dournon for Dictionnaire d’orthographe et des difficultés du français
 1977 :
 Henri Bénac and Édouard Bled for Guide pratique d’orthographe
 1978 :
 Claude Désirat, Émile Genouvrier and Tristan Hordé (1932-....) for Nouveau Dictionnaire des Synonymes
 1979 :
 Jean-Pol Caput (1937-2001) for L’Académie française et la pureté de la langue française entre 1859 et 1935 (L’orthographe et la prononciation)
 Adelin Moulis for Le dictionnaire languedocien-français
 René Nelli for Mais enfin qu’est-ce que l’Occitanie ?
 Jean H. Zemb for Comparaison de Deux Systèmes
 1980 :
 Maurice Maloux for Dictionnaire des proverbes, sentences et maximes
 André Porquet (1916-....) for L’orthographe sans peine
 1983 :
 Henri Bertaud du Chazaud for Dictionnaire des synonymes
 Jean-Yves Dournon for Le grand dictionnaire des citations françaises
 1984 :
 Louis-Marie Morfaux (19..-1998) for Vocabulaire de la philosophie et des sciences humaines
 1985 :
 Roger Morvan for Le petit Retz-Morvan
 Henri de Vaulchier for Charles Nodier et la lexicographie française 1808-1844
 1986 :
 Georges Matoré for Le vocabulaire et la société médiévale
 1987 :
 Jean-Yves Dournon for Le dictionnaire des proverbes et dictons de France
 1988 :
 Gérard Cornu for Vocabulaire juridique
 1989 :
 Loïc Depecker for Les Mots de la francophonie

Laureates from the Académie des inscriptions et belles-lettres

From 1901 to 1950
 1901:
 Georges Louis Rodier for his translation of Traité de l'âme, d'Aristote.
 Philippe-Ernest Legrand for his study on Theocritus.
 Alcide Macé (1862-19..) for his essay on Suetonius.
 1902:
 Charles Diehl for Justinien et la civilisation byzantine au vie siècle.
 Fernand de Mély for Les Reliques de Constantinople au XIIIe siècle et l'ensemble de ses travaux archéologiques.
 1903:
 Charles Fossey for La Magie assyrienne.
 Joanny Grosset for the translation of Bharatya-Natya-Castram.
 Alexandre Moret for Le rituel du culte divin journalier en Égypte.
 Paul Toscanne (1867-1919) for Les Cylindres de Gudéa.

Laureates from the Academie des sciences morales et politiques
 1978 : Annuaire de l'Afrique du Nord
 2000 : Michel Espagne for Les transferts culturels franco-allemands, Paris (PUF), 2000. (Ethics et sociology)
 2002 : Raoul Béteille for De l’injustice, Paris (François-Xavier de Guibert), 2001. (Legislation, public law and jurisprudence)
 2004 : Jean-Pierre Boisivon for all of his work. (Political Economy, statistics et finances)
 2006 : Michèle Cointet for De Gaulle et Giraud. L’affrontement, Paris (Perrin), 2006. (History et Geography)
 2008 : Jean Garrigues for the direction of Histoire du Parlement de 1789 à nos jours et Grands discours parlementaires (de la Révolution à la Ve République), Paris (Armand Colin), 6 volumes, 2004-2008. (General)
 2010 : Marie Pérouse for L’invention des Pensées de Pascal. Les éditions de Port-Royal (1670-1678), Paris (Honoré Champion), 2009. (Philosophy)
 2012 : Élisabeth Dufourcq for L’invention de la loi naturelle, Paris, Bayard, 2012. (Ethics and sociology)
 2014 : Christophe Bigot for his work Pratique du droit de la presse. Presse écrite – Audiovisuel – Internet, Paris (Victoires Éditions), 2013. (Legislation, public law and jurisprudence)
 2016 : Bertrand Martinot and Franck Morel for their work Un autre droit du travail est possible, Paris, (Fayard), 2016. (Political Economy, statistics et finances)

References

1835 establishments in France
Organizations established in 1835